The Howling Hex is an American rock band founded by guitarist Neil Hagerty.

Discography

Albums
Introducing the Howling Hex LP, 2003
Section 2 LP, 2004
The Return of the Third Tower LP, 2004
All-Night Fox CD, 2005
You Can't Beat Tomorrow CD/DVD, 2005
1-2-3 CD, 2006
Nightclub Version of the Eternal CD, 2006
The Howling Hex XI LP, CD, 2007
Earth Junk LP, CD, 2008
Rogue Moon LP, 2009
 Victory Chimp, A Book 4XCD Audiobook 2011
Wilson Semiconductors LP, CD 2011
Navajo Rag Cassette, 2012
The Best of The Howling Hex LP, CD 2013

Compilations
Four-beat Rhythm: The Writings of Wilhelm Reich CD, 2013

External links
 
 Review of "Niteclub Version of the Eternal" in outsideleft.com

Indie rock musical groups from New Mexico
Drag City (record label) artists
Musical groups established in 2003